Thai clubs history of playing in the AFC Cup. Osotsapa were the first side to take part since the competition started in 2004. After the revamping of the Champions League in 2009, Thai clubs once again entered. Since 2013, Thailand was given a direct spot in the AFC Champions League group stage and could not participate in the AFC Cup.

Participations 
 QS: Qualifying Stage, GS: Group Stage, R16: Round of 16, QF: Quarterfinals, SF: Semifinals, RU: Runners-Up, W: Winners

1 Eliminated from AFC Champions League qualifying stage

Statistics by club

Chonburi

Results

Muangthong United

Results

Osotsapa

Results

PEA

Results

Thai Port

Results

See also 
 AFC Cup
 Thai clubs in the Asian Club Championship
 Thai clubs in the AFC Champions League
 Thai football records and statistics

Thai football clubs in international competitions